The historical reliability of the Gospels is the reliability and historic character of the four New Testament gospels as historical documents. While all four canonical gospels contain some sayings and events which may meet one or more of the five criteria for historical reliability used in biblical studies, the assessment and evaluation of these elements is a matter of ongoing debate. Virtually all scholars of antiquity agree that a human Jesus existed, but scholars differ on the historicity of specific episodes described in the biblical accounts of Jesus, and the only two events subject to "almost universal assent" are that Jesus was baptized by John the Baptist and was crucified by the order of the Roman Prefect Pontius Pilate. Elements whose historical authenticity is disputed include the two accounts of the Nativity of Jesus, the miraculous events including the resurrection, and certain details about the crucifixion.

According to the majority viewpoint, the gospels of Matthew, Mark, and Luke, collectively referred to as the Synoptic Gospels, are the primary sources of historical information about Jesus and of the religious movement he founded. The fourth gospel, the Gospel of John, differs greatly from the first three gospels. Historians often study the historical reliability of the Acts of the Apostles when studying the reliability of the gospels, as Acts was seemingly written by the same author as the Gospel of Luke.

Among scholars, a growing majority considers the Gospels to be in the genre of Ancient Greco-Roman biographies, the same genre as Plutarch's Life of Alexander and Life of Caesar. Typically, ancient biographies written shortly after the death of the subject include substantial history.

Historians subject the gospels to critical analysis, attempting to differentiate, rather than authenticate, reliable information from possible inventions, exaggerations, and alterations. Scholars use textual criticism to resolve questions arising from textual variations among the numerous manuscripts that have been discovered to decide the most reliable wording of a text as close to what the "original" may have looked like. Scholars seek to answer questions of authorship, date and purpose of composition, and look at internal and external sources to determine the degree of reliability of the gospel traditions.

Methodology
In evaluating the historical reliability of the Gospels, scholars consider authorship and date of composition, intention and genre, gospel sources and oral tradition, textual criticism, and historical authenticity of specific sayings and narrative events.

Scope and genre
"Gospels" is the standard term for the four New Testament books carrying the names of Matthew, Mark, Luke and John, each telling of the life and teachings of Jesus of Nazareth (including his dealings with John the Baptist, his trial and execution, the discovery of his empty tomb, and, at least for three of them, his appearances to his disciples following his death).

The genre of the gospels is essential in understanding the intentions of the authors regarding the historical value of the texts.  New Testament scholar Graham Stanton states that "the gospels are now widely considered to be a sub-set of the broad ancient literary genre of biographies." Charles H. Talbert agrees that the gospels should be grouped with the Graeco-Roman biographies, but adds that such biographies included an element of mythology, and that the synoptic gospels also included elements of mythology. E.P. Sanders states that "these Gospels were written with the intention of glorifying Jesus and are not strictly biographical in nature." Ingrid Maisch and Anton Vögtle writing for Karl Rahner in his encyclopedia of theological terms indicate that the gospels were written primarily as theological, not historical items. Erasmo Leiva-Merikakis notes that "we must conclude, then, that the genre of the Gospel is not that of pure 'history'; but neither is it that of myth, fairy tale, or legend. In fact, 'gospel' constitutes a genre all its own, a surprising novelty in the literature of the ancient world."

Scholars tend to consider Luke's works (Luke-Acts) to be closer in genre to "pure" history, although they also note that "This is not to say that he [Luke] was always reliably informed, or that – any more than modern historians – he always presented a severely factual account of events."
New Testament scholar, James D.G. Dunn believed that "the earliest tradents within the Christian churches [were] preservers more than innovators...seeking to transmit, retell, explain, interpret, elaborate, but not create de novo...Through the main body of the Synoptic tradition, I believe, we have in most cases direct access to the teaching and ministry of Jesus as it was remembered from the beginning of the transmission process (which often predates Easter) and so fairly direct access to the ministry and teaching of Jesus through the eyes and ears of those who went about with him." Nevertheless, David Jenkins, a former Anglican Bishop of Durham and university professor, has stated that "Certainly not! There is absolutely no certainty in the New Testament about anything of importance."

Criteria
Critical scholars have developed a number of criteria to evaluate the probability, or historical authenticity, of an attested event or saying represented in the gospels. These criteria are the criterion of dissimilarity; the criterion of embarrassment; the criterion of multiple attestation; the criterion of cultural and historical congruency; the criterion of "Aramaisms". They are applied to the sayings and events as described in the Gospels, in order to evaluate their historical reliability.

The criterion of dissimilarity argues that if a saying or action is dissimilar to, or contrary to, the views of Judaism in the context of Jesus or the views of the early church, then it can more confidently be regarded as an authentic saying or action of Jesus. One commonly cited example of this is Jesus' controversial reinterpretation of the Mosaic law in his Sermon on the Mount, or Peter's decision to allow uncircumcised gentiles into what was, at the time, a sect of Judaism.

The criterion of embarrassment holds that the authors of the gospels had no reason to invent embarrassing incidents such as the denial of Jesus by Peter, or the fleeing of Jesus' followers after his arrest, and therefore such details would likely not have been included unless they were true. Bart Ehrman, using the criterion of dissimilarity to judge the historical reliability of the claim Jesus was baptized by John the Baptist, notes that "it is hard to imagine a Christian inventing the story of Jesus' baptism since this could be taken to mean that he was John's subordinate."

The criterion of multiple attestation says that when two or more independent sources present similar or consistent accounts, it is more likely that the accounts are accurate reports of events or that they are reporting a tradition which pre-dates the sources themselves. Since Matthew and Luke borrow a lot of material from Mark, an agreement among the synoptic gospels is not evidence of independent sources, but often they recount the same events as John, and in many cases Paul's epistles attest to these events as well. The writings of the early church provide additional evidence, as to a limited degree do non-Christian ancient writings.

The criterion of cultural and historical congruency says that a source is less credible if the account contradicts known historical facts, or if it conflicts with cultural practices common in the period in question. It is, therefore, more credible if it agrees with those known facts. For example, this is often used when assessing the reliability of claims in Luke-Acts, such as the official title of Pontius Pilate. Through linguistic criteria a number of conclusions can be drawn.

The criterion of "Aramaisms" as it is often referred holds that if a saying of Jesus has Aramaic roots, reflecting Jesus' Palestinian context, the saying is more likely to be authentic.

Formation and sources

From oral traditions to written gospels
In the immediate aftermath of Jesus' death his followers expected him to return at any moment, certainly within their own lifetimes, and in consequence there was little motivation to write anything down for future generations; but as eyewitnesses began to die, and as the missionary needs of the church grew, there was an increasing demand and need for written versions of the founder's life and teachings. The stages of this process can be summarised as follows:
 Oral traditions – stories and sayings passed on largely as separate self-contained units, not in any order;
 Written collections of miracle stories, parables, sayings, etc., with oral tradition continuing alongside these;
 Written proto-gospels preceding and serving as sources for the gospels;
 Canonical gospels of Matthew, Mark, Luke and John composed from these sources.

The New Testament preserves signs of these oral traditions and early documents: for example, parallel passages between Matthew, Mark and Luke on one hand and the Pauline epistles and the Epistle to the Hebrews on the other are typically explained by assuming that all were relying on a shared oral tradition, and the dedicatory preface of Luke refers to previous written accounts of the life of Jesus. The early traditions were fluid and subject to alteration, sometimes transmitted by those who had known Jesus personally, but more often by wandering prophets and teachers like the Apostle Paul, who knew him through visionary experiences. The early prophets and leaders of local Christian communities and their followers were more focused on the Kingdom of God than on the life of Jesus: Paul for example, says very little about him beyond that he was "born of a woman" (meaning that he was a man and not a phantom), that he was a Jew, and that he suffered, died, and was resurrected: what mattered for Paul was not Jesus's teachings or the details of his death and resurrection, but the kingdom.

The four canonical gospels were first mentioned between 120 and 150 by Justin Martyr, who lived c.100-185. Justin had no titles for them and simply called them the "memoirs of the Apostles", but around 185 Iraneus, a bishop of Lyon who lived c.130–c.202, attributed them to: 1) Matthew, an apostle who followed Jesus in his earthly career; 2) Mark, who while himself not a disciple was the companion of Peter, who was; 3) Luke, the companion of Paul, the author of the Pauline epistles; and 4) John, who like Matthew was an apostle who had known Jesus. The scholarly consensus is that they are the work of unknown Christians and were composed c.68-110 AD. The majority of New Testament scholars agree that the Gospels do not contain eyewitness accounts; but that they present the theologies of their communities rather than the testimony of eyewitnesses.

The synoptics: Matthew, Mark and Luke

Matthew, Mark and Luke are called the synoptic gospels because they share many stories (the technical term is pericopes), sometimes even identical wording; finding an explanation for their similarities, and also their differences, is known as the synoptic problem, and most scholars believe that the best solution to the problem is that Mark was the first gospel to be written and served as the source for the other two - alternative theories exist, but create more problems than they solve.

Matthew and Luke also share a large amount of material which is not found in Mark; this appears in the same order in each, although not always in the same contexts, leading scholars to the conclusion that in addition to Mark they also shared a lost source called the Q document (from "Quelle", the German word for "source); its existence and use alongside Mark by the authors of Matthew and Luke seems the most convincing solution to the synoptic problem.

Matthew and Luke contain some material unique to each, called the M source (or Special Matthew) for Matthew and the L source (Special Luke) for Luke. This includes some of the best-known stories in the gospels, such as the birth of Christ and the Parable of the Good Samaritan (unique to Luke) and the Parable of the Pearl of Great Price (unique to Matthew).

The Hebrew scriptures were also an important source for all three, and for John. Direct quotations number 27 in Mark, 54 in Matthew, 24 in Luke, and 14 in John, and the influence of the scriptures is vastly increased when allusions and echoes are included. Half of Mark's gospel, for example, is made up of allusions to and citations of the scriptures, which he uses to structure his narrative and to present his understanding of the ministry, passion, death and resurrection of Jesus (for example, the final cry from the cross, "My God, my God, why have you forsaken me?" is an exact quotation from Psalm 22:1). Matthew contains all Mark's quotations and introduces around 30 more, sometimes in the mouth of Jesus, sometimes as his own commentary on the narrative, and Luke makes allusions to all but three of the Old Testament books.

Mark
Tradition holds that the gospel was written by Mark the Evangelist, St. Peter's interpreter, but its reliance on several underlying sources, varying in form and in theology, makes this unlikely. Most scholars believe it was written shortly before or after the fall of Jerusalem and the destruction of the Second Temple in the year 70, and internal evidence suggests that it probably originated in Syria or Palestine among a Christian community consisting at least partly of non-Jews who spoke Greek rather than Aramaic and did not understand Jewish culture.

Scholars since the 19th century have regarded Mark as the first of the gospels (called the theory of Markan priority). Markan priority led to the belief that Mark must be the most reliable of the gospels, but today there is a large consensus that the author of Mark was not intending to write history. Mark preserves memories of real people (including the disciples), places and circumstances, but it is based on previously existing traditions which have been selected and arranged by the author to express his understanding of the significance of Jesus.

Mark is a counter-narrative to the myth of Imperial rule crafted by Vespasian.
In 1901 William Wrede demonstrated that Mark was not a simple historical account of the life of Jesus but a work of theology compiled by an author who was a creative artist. Among the works that the author of Mark may have drawn from include the Elijah-Elisha narrative in the Book of Kings and the Pauline letters, notably 1 Corinthians, as well as the works of Homer.

Matthew and Luke
The consensus of scholars dates Matthew and Luke to 80-90 AD. The scholarly consensus is that Matthew originated in a "Matthean community" in the city of Antioch, located in modern-day Turkey; Luke was written in a large city west of Palestine, for an educated Greek-speaking audience.
Scholars doubt that the authors were the evangelists Matthew and Luke: it seems unlikely, for example, that Matthew would rely so heavily on Mark if its author had been an eyewitness to Jesus's ministry, or that the Acts of Apostles (by the same author as the gospel of Luke) would so frequently contradict the Pauline letters if its author had been Paul's companion. Instead, the two took for their sources the gospel of Mark (606 of Matthew's verses are taken from Mark, 320 of Luke's), the Q source, and the "special" material of M and L.

Q (Quelle)
Mark has 661 verses, 637 of which are reproduced in Matthew and/or Luke. Matthew and Luke share a further 200 verses (roughly) which are not taken from Mark: this is called the Q source. Q is usually dated about a decade earlier than Mark; some scholars argue that it was a single written document, others for multiple documents, and others that there was a core written Q accompanied by an oral tradition. Despite ongoing debate over its exact content - some Q materials in Matthew and Luke are identical word for word, but others are substantially different - there is general consensus about the passages that belong to it. It has no passion story and no resurrection, but the Aramaic form of some sayings suggests that its nucleus reaches back to the earliest Palestinian community and even the lifetime of Jesus.

Identifying the community of Q and the circumstances in which it was created and used  is difficult, but it probably originated in Galilee, in a movement in opposition to the leadership in Jerusalem, as a set of short speeches relating to specific occasions such as covenant-renewal, the commissioning of missionaries, prayers for the Kingdom of God, and calling down divine judgement on their enemies the Pharisees. A large majority of scholars consider it to be among the oldest and most reliable material in the gospels.

M and L (Special Matthew and Special Luke)
The premise that Matthew and Luke used sources in addition to Mark and Q is fairly widely accepted, although many details are disputed, including whether they were written or oral, or the invention of the gospel authors, or Q material that happened to be used by only one gospel, or a combination of these.

John
The Gospel of John is a relatively late theological document containing little accurate historical information that is not found in the three synoptic gospels, which is why most historical studies have been based on the earliest sources Mark and Q. It speaks of an unnamed "disciple whom Jesus loved" as the source of its traditions, but does not say specifically that he is its author; Christian tradition identifies him as John the Apostle, but the majority of modern scholars have abandoned this or hold it only tenuously. Most scholars believe it was written c. 90–110 AD, at Ephesus in Anatolia (although other possibilities are Antioch, Northern Syria, Palestine and Alexandria)
and went through two or three "editions" before reaching its final form, although a minority continue to support unitary composition.

The fact that the format of John follows that set by Mark need not imply that the author knew Mark, for there are no identical or almost-identical passages; rather, this was most probably the accepted shape for a gospel by the time John was written. Nevertheless, John's discourses are full of synoptic-like material: some scholars think this indicates that the author knew the synoptics, although others believe it points instead to a shared base in the oral tradition. John nevertheless differs radically from them:

Texts

Textual criticism resolves questions arising from the variations between texts: put another way, it seeks to decide the most reliable wording of a text. Ancient scribes made errors or alterations (such as including non-authentic additions). In attempting to determine the original text of the New Testament books, some modern textual critics have identified sections as additions of material, centuries after the gospel was written. These are called interpolations. In modern translations of the Bible, the results of textual criticism have led to certain verses, words and phrases being left out or marked as not original.

For example, there are a number of Bible verses in the New Testament that are present in the King James Version (KJV) but are absent from most modern Bible translations. Most modern textual scholars consider these verses interpolations (exceptions include advocates of the Byzantine or Majority text). The verse numbers have been reserved, but without any text, so as to preserve the traditional numbering of the remaining verses. The biblical scholar Bart D. Ehrman notes that many current verses were not part of the original text of the New Testament. "These scribal additions are often found in late medieval manuscripts of the New Testament, but not in the manuscripts of the earlier centuries," he adds. "And because the King James Bible is based on later manuscripts, such verses "became part of the Bible tradition in English-speaking lands." He notes, however, that modern English translations, such as the New International Version, were written by using a more appropriate textual method.

Most modern Bibles have footnotes to indicate passages that have disputed source documents.  Bible Commentaries also discuss these, sometimes in great detail. While many variations have been discovered between early copies of biblical texts, most of these are variations in spelling, punctuation, or grammar. Also, many of these variants are so particular to the Greek language that they would not appear in translations into other languages.

Three of the most important interpolations are the last verses of the Gospel of Mark the story of the adulterous woman in the Gospel of John, and the explicit reference to the Trinity in 1 John to have been a later addition.

The New Testament has been preserved in more than 5,800 fragmentary Greek manuscripts, 10,000 Latin manuscripts and 9,300 manuscripts in various other ancient languages including Syriac, Slavic, Ethiopic and Armenian. Not all biblical manuscripts come from orthodox Christian writers. For example, the Gnostic writings of Valentinus come from the 2nd century AD, and these Christians were regarded as heretics by the mainstream church. The sheer number of witnesses presents unique difficulties, although it gives scholars a better idea of how close modern bibles are to the original versions. Bruce Metzger says  "The more often you have copies that agree with each other, especially if they emerge from different geographical areas, the more you can cross-check them to figure out what the original document was like. The only way they'd agree would be where they went back genealogically in a family tree that represents the descent of the manuscripts.

In "The Text Of The New Testament", Kurt Aland and Barbara Aland compare the total number of variant-free verses, and the number of variants per page (excluding spelling errors), among the seven major editions of the Greek NT (Tischendorf, Westcott-Hort, von Soden, Vogels, Merk, Bover and Nestle-Aland), concluding that 62.9%, or 4,999/7,947, are in agreement. They concluded, "Thus in nearly two-thirds of the New Testament text, the seven editions of the Greek New Testament which we have reviewed are in complete accord, with no differences other than in orthographical details (e.g., the spelling of names). Verses in which any one of the seven editions differs by a single word are not counted. ... In the Gospels, Acts, and Revelation the agreement is less, while in the letters it is much greater" Per Aland and Aland, the total consistency achieved in the Gospel of Matthew was 60% (642 verses out of 1,071), the total consistency achieved in the Gospel of Mark was 45% (306 verses out of 678), the total consistency achieved in the Gospel of Luke was 57% (658 verses out of 1,151), and the total consistency achieved in the Gospel of John was 52% (450 verses out of 869). Almost all of these variants are minor, and most of them are spelling or grammatical errors. Almost all can be explained by some type of unintentional scribal mistake, such as poor eyesight. Very few variants are contested among scholars, and few or none of the contested variants carry any theological significance. Modern biblical translations reflect this scholarly consensus where the variants exist, while the disputed variants are typically noted as such in the translations.

A quantitative study on the stability of the New Testament compared early manuscripts to later manuscripts, up to the Middle Ages, with the Byzantine manuscripts, and concluded that the text had more than 90% stability over this time period. It has been estimated that only 0.1% to 0.2% of the New Testament variants impact the meaning of the texts in any significant fashion.

Individual units 

Authors such as Raymond Brown point out that the Gospels contradict each other in various important respects and on various important details. W. D. Davies and E. P. Sanders state that: "on many points, especially about Jesus' early life, the evangelists were ignorant … they simply did not know and, guided by rumour, hope or supposition, did the best they could".

Preexistence of Jesus
The gospel of John begins with a statement that the Logos existed from the beginning, and was God.

Genealogy, nativity and childhood of Jesus
The genealogy, birth and childhood of Jesus appear only in Matthew and Luke, and are ascribed to Special Matthew and Special Luke.
Only Luke and Matthew have nativity narratives. Modern critical scholars consider both to be non-historical. Many biblical scholars view the discussion of historicity as secondary, given that gospels were primarily written as theological documents rather than historical accounts.

The nativity narratives found in the Gospel of Matthew and the Gospel of Luke give a genealogy of Jesus, but the names, and even the number of generations, differ between the two. Some authors have suggested that the differences are the result of two different lineages, Matthew's from King David's son, Solomon, to Jacob, father of Joseph, and Luke's from King David's other son, Nathan, to Heli, father of Mary and father-in-law of Joseph. However, Geza Vermes argues that Luke makes no mention of Mary, and questions what purpose a maternal genealogy would serve in a Jewish setting.

Dating the birth of Jesus
 
Both Luke and Matthew date Jesus' birth to within the rule of King Herod the Great, who died in 4BC. However the Gospel of Luke also dates the birth ten years after Herod's death, during the census of Quirinius in 6 AD described by the historian Josephus. Raymond E. Brown notes that "most critical scholars acknowledge a confusion and misdating on Luke's part."

Teachings of Jesus
According to John P. Meier, only a few of the parables can be attributed with confidence to the historical Jesus, although other scholars disagree  Meier argues that most of them come from the M and L sources (rather than Mark or Q), but marked by the special language and theology of each of those gospels; this leads to the conclusion that they are not the original words of Jesus, but have been reworked by the gospel-authors.

Passion narrative
The entry of Jesus into Jerusalem recalls the entry of Judas Maccabeus; the Last Supper is mentioned only in the synoptics.

Death of Judas
There is a contradiction regarding the death of Judas Iscariot with the account of his death in Acts differing from the one given in Matthew. In Matthew 27:3–8, Judas returns the bribe he has been given for handing over Jesus, throwing the money into the temple before he hangs himself. The temple priests, unwilling to return the defiled money to the treasury, use it instead to buy a field known as the Potter's Field, as a plot in which to bury strangers. In Acts 1:18 Peter says that Judas used the bribe money to buy the field himself, and his death is attributed to injuries from having fallen in this field. Some apologists argue that the contradictory stories can be reconciled.

Archeology and geography

Archaeological tools are very limited with respect to questions of existence of any specific individuals from the ancient past. According to Eric Cline, there is no direct archaeological evidence of the existence of a historical Jesus, any of the apostles, or the majority of people in antiquity. Bart Ehrman states that having no archeological evidence is not an argument for the non-existence of Jesus because we have no archaeological evidence from anyone else from Jesus's day either. Craig Evans notes that archaeologists have some indirect information on how Jesus' life might have been from archaeological finds from Nazareth, the High Priest Caiaphas' ossuary, numerous synagogue buildings, and Jehohanan, a crucified victim who had a Jewish burial after execution. Archaeologists have uncovered a site in Capernaum which is traditionally believed, with "no definitive proof" and based only upon circumstantial evidence, to have been the House of Peter, and which may thus possibly have housed Jesus. Some of the places mentioned in the gospels have been verified by archaeological evidence, such as the Pool of Bethesda, the Pool of Siloam, and the Temple Mount platform extension by King Herod. A mosaic from a third century church in Megiddo mentions Jesus. A geological study based on sediments near the Dead Sea indicate that an earthquake occurred around 31 AD ± 5 years, which plausibly coincides with the earthquake reported by Matthew 27 near the time of the crucifixion of Christ.

See also
 Authority (textual criticism)
 Bible version debate
 Biblical manuscript
 Christ myth theory
 Criticism of the Bible
 Development of the New Testament canon
 Gospel harmony
 Jesus Seminar
 Jesus in comparative mythology
 Life of Jesus in the New Testament
 Scholarly interpretation of Gospel elements

Notes

References

Citations

Bibliography

 
  
 
 
 

 
 
 
 
 
 
 
 
 
 
 
 

 
 
 
 
 
 
 
 
 
 
 
 
 
 
 
 
 
 
 
 
 
 
 
 
 
 
 
 
 
 
 
 
 
 
 
 
 
 
 
 
 
 
 
 
 

 Bock, Darrell L., Studying the Historical Jesus: A Guide to Sources and Methods.. Baker Academic: 2002. .

 Grant, Michael. Jesus: A Historian's Review of the Gospels. Scribner's, 1977. .
Meier, John P., A Marginal Jew: Rethinking the Historical Jesus, Doubleday,
v. 1, The Roots of the Problem and the Person, 1991, 
v. 2, Mentor, Message, and Miracles, 1994,  
v. 3, Companions and Competitors, 2001, 
v. 4, Law and Love 
v. 5, Probing the Authenticity of the Parables 
 Sanders, E.P. Jesus and Judaism. Augsburg Fortress Publishers: 1987.
 Wright, N.T. Christian Origins and the Question of God, a projected 6 volume series of which 3 have been published under:
v. 1, The New Testament and the People of God. Augsburg Fortress Publishers: 1992.;
v. 2, Jesus and the Victory of God. Augsburg Fortress Publishers: 1997.;
v. 3, The Resurrection of the Son of God. Augsburg Fortress Publishers: 2003.
 Wright, N.T. The Challenge of Jesus: Rediscovering who Jesus was and is. IVP 1996

 
Canonical Gospels
Gospels